The Freedom Party is a political party in Lithuania, founded on 1 June 2019 and led by former Liberal Movement member Aušrinė Armonaitė.

History
The party has its roots in Vilnius mayor Remigijus Šimašius's list "For Vilnius, which we are proud of!", which won the Lithuanian capital's council and mayoral election. In November 2018 Aušrinė Armonaitė announced intentions to found a new party.

By the summer and autumn of 2019, the party established its branches in cities and their surrounding municipalities.

The party was accepted as a full member of the Alliance of Liberals and Democrats for Europe in October 2019. The party saw success in 2020 Lithuanian parliamentary election and obtained 11 seats. After this, the party joined coalition with the Homeland Union and Liberal Movement.

On 11 December 2021, the Freedom Party officially became a full member of the ALDE Party.

Platform 
According to Freedom Party's program, the party stands for the following:

 No new taxes 
 Legalising same-sex marriage
 Carbon neutrality by the year 2040
 Decriminalising drugs 
 Possibility to perform military service as a civilian service, e.g. in hospitals or school
 Recognizing the statehood of Taiwan (Republic of China) as a country separate from the People's Republic of China.

Election results

Seimas

Seimas members (2020–2024)

See also 

 Liberalism in Lithuania
 Lithuanian Liberal Youth

References

2019 establishments in Lithuania
Political parties established in 2019
Alliance of Liberals and Democrats for Europe Party member parties
Centrist parties in Lithuania
Feminist parties in Europe
LGBT rights organizations
Liberal parties in Lithuania
Pro-European political parties in Lithuania
Progressive parties
Social liberal parties